Darrel Scoville (born October 13, 1975) is a Canadian former professional ice hockey defenceman. He played in the National Hockey League for the Calgary Flames and the Columbus Blue Jackets between 1999 and 2004, playing 16 regular season games, scoring 1 assist and collecting 12 penalty minutes. He also played in the American Hockey League for the Saint John Flames (scoring the Calder Cup championship-clinching goal in the 2001 AHL Calder Cup Finals), Syracuse Crunch, Hershey Bears and the Providence Bruins. He signed to Black Wings in 2009.

Career statistics

Regular season and playoffs

Awards and honors

References

External links
 

1975 births
Living people
Calgary Flames players
Canadian expatriate ice hockey players in Austria
Canadian ice hockey defencemen
Columbus Blue Jackets players
EC VSV players
HC Alleghe players
Hershey Bears players
Ice hockey people from Saskatchewan
Merrimack Warriors men's ice hockey players
People from Swift Current
Providence Bruins players
Saint John Flames players
Syracuse Crunch players
Undrafted National Hockey League players